Pizza capricciosa is a style of pizza in Italian cuisine prepared with mozzarella cheese, Italian baked ham, mushroom, artichoke and tomato. Types of edible mushrooms used may include cremini (white mushrooms) and others. Some versions may also use prosciutto (a dry-cured ham), marinated artichoke hearts, olive oil, olives, basil leaves, and egg. Some versions may be prepared using a thin crust. Although it has similar ingredients to pizza quattro stagioni, they are arranged differently.

See also
 List of pizza varieties by country

References

Further reading
 

capricciosa